Visalia Buddhist Church (or Visalia Buddhist Temple) is a Buddhist temple in Visalia, California. It is an affiliate of the Buddhist Churches of America.

History
After World War II, the Buddhist community in California struggled to recover due to the displacement of Japanese American citizens. Ministers from the Visalia Buddhist Church would travel to Bakersfield, California on a monthly basis to provide the community at the Buddhist Church of Bakersfield with religious services.

Over the course of its development, the Visalia Buddhist Church has sponsored affiliated organizations including the Visalia Buddhist Church Club and the Samurais basketball team.

Temple leaders have commented on the community's socially eclectic atmosphere due to its inclusion of people from various ethnic and religious backgrounds.

References

External links
Official website
Facebook page

20th-century Buddhist temples
Buddhist temples in California
Religious buildings and structures in California
Buildings and structures in Visalia, California
Japanese-American culture in California
Buddhist Churches of America